Pioneer House or Pioneer Cabin or Pioneer Farm may refer to:

Television
 Colonial House (TV series), a TV series also known as Pioneer House

Places
Sitka Pioneers' Home, Sitka, AK, listed on the NRHP in Alaska
Pioneer House (Clarksville, Arkansas), listed on the NRHP in Arkansas
Pioneer Sod House, Wheat Ridge, CO, listed on the NRHP in Colorado
Pioneer Cabin (Colorado Springs, Colorado), listed on the NRHP in Colorado
Pioneer Log Cabin, Bowling Green, KY, listed on the NRHP in Kentucky
Pioneer Farm (Dansville, New York), listed on the NRHP in New York
Saint's Rest, Tukey's Pioneer Cabin and Homestead House, Port Townsend, WA, listed on the NRHP in Washington

Other
Pioneer Cabin Tree, a giant sequoia that stood in Calaveras Big Trees State Park

See also
Pioneer Hall (disambiguation)